Jet blast is the phenomenon of rapid air movement produced by the jet engines of aircraft, particularly on or before takeoff.

Jet blast can be a hazard to people or other unsecured objects behind the aircraft, and is capable of flattening buildings and destroying vehicles. 

Despite the power and potentially destructive nature of jet blast, there are relatively few jet blast incidents. Due to the invisible nature of jet blast and the aerodynamic properties of light aircraft, light aircraft moving about airports are particularly vulnerable.  Pilots of light aircraft frequently stay off to the side of the runway, rather than follow in the centre, to negate the effect of the blast.

Propeller planes are also capable of generating significant rearwards winds, known as prop wash.

Maho Beach in Sint Maarten is famous for its unique proximity to the runway of Princess Juliana International Airport, allowing people to experience jet blast, a practice that is discouraged by the local authorities. A tourist was killed on 12 July 2017 when she was blown away by jet blast, which caused her head to smash into concrete. Skiathos Airport in Greece similarly allows people to experience jet blast, as its runway is located near a public road.

Some airports have installed jet blast deflectors in areas where roads or people may be in the path of the jet blast on take off.

In one episode of Mythbusters, the effects of jet blasts are shown.

See also
 Maho Beach, a beach in Saint Maarten popular for experiencing jet blast

References

External links
 NASA site on jet blast

Aircraft engines
Aviation safety
Aviation risks